Francisco Risiglione (January 18, 1917 - July 28, 1999) was an Argentine boxer who competed in the 1936 Summer Olympics.

In 1936 he won the bronze medal in the light heavyweight class after winning the third place fight against Robey Leibbrandt of South Africa.

References

1917 births
Boxers at the 1936 Summer Olympics
Light-heavyweight boxers
Olympic boxers of Argentina
Olympic bronze medalists for Argentina
Olympic medalists in boxing
1999 deaths
Argentine male boxers
Medalists at the 1936 Summer Olympics